Kopp is a German surname. Notable people with the surname include:

 Elisabeth Kopp (born 1936), Swiss politician
 Emanuel Kopp (born 1980), Austrian economist
 Emil Kopp (1817–1875), French chemist
 Georg von Kopp (1837–1914), German cardinal
 Georges Kopp (1902–1951), Belgian commander of Republican forces in the Spanish Civil War
 Hal Kopp (1909–1998), American college football coach
 Harry Kopp (1880–1943), American lawyer and politician
 Hermann Kopp (born 1954), German composer and musician
 Hermann Franz Moritz Kopp (1817–1892), German chemist
 James Charles Kopp (born 1954), American murderer
 Johann Heinrich Kopp (1777–1858), German physician
 Joseph Eutych Kopp (1793–1866), Swiss antiquarian (see Kopp, Joseph Eutychius, Encyclopedia Americana (1920)
 Magdalena Kopp (1948–2015), member of the Frankfurt Revolutionary Cells (RZ), wife and accomplice of Carlos the Jackal
 Nancy K. Kopp (born 1943), American politician
 Pavol Kopp, Slovak sport shooter
 Quentin L. Kopp (born 1928), American politician
 Sheldon Kopp (1929–1999), American psychotherapist
 Stephen J. Kopp (1951–2014), American university president
 Viktor Kopp (1880–1930), Russian and Soviet diplomat
 David Kopp (born 1979), German race cyclist 
 Wendy Kopp (born 1967), president and founder of Teach For America

Surnames from nicknames